The House of Temperley is a 1913 British silent drama film directed by Harold M. Shaw and starring Charles Maude, Ben Webster and Lillian Logan. It is based on the 1896 novel Rodney Stone by Arthur Conan Doyle and is sometimes known by the alternative title Rodney Stone. The House of Temperley was the first film made by the London Film Company and first shown in Nottingham.

Cast
 Charles Maude - Captain Jack Temperley
 Ben Webster - Sir Charles Temperley
 Lillian Logan - Ethel Morley
 Charles Rock - Sir John Hawker
 Edward O'Neill - Jakes
 Wyndham Guise - Ginger Stubbs
 Cecil Morton York - Gentleman Jackson
 Claire Pauncefort - Lady Temperley
 Rex Davis - Gloster Dick
 John East - Tom Cribb
 Hubert Willis - Shelton
 F. Bennington - Joe Berks

References

External links

1913 films
1913 drama films
Films directed by Harold M. Shaw
Films based on British novels
Films set in England
British silent feature films
British drama films
British black-and-white films
1910s English-language films
1910s British films
Silent drama films